Troy Eugene Percival (born August 9, 1969) is an American baseball coach and former professional baseball pitcher. He gained fame as a closer. During a 14-year baseball career spanning from 1995 to 2009, he pitched for four Major League Baseball (MLB) teams, primarily with the California/Anaheim Angels. He was an integral part of that franchise's 2002 World Series championship team.

Early career
Percival started playing baseball at Moreno Valley Youth Federation (MVYF). Percival played on the Moreno Valley High School baseball team, before attending the University of California, Riverside, where he played college baseball for the Highlanders from 1987–1990. He was then drafted by the California Angels in the 6th round of the 1990 amateur draft as a catcher. He batted .203 in his only season as a catcher with the Boise Hawks and was converted to a pitcher when coaches noticed that his return throws to the mound were actually faster than the pitches he caught. He was coached by his father Richard Percival for all of his childhood years.

Closer career
In , he became the regular closer for the Angels and had 36 saves with 100 strikeouts in 74 innings. He is one of only six pitchers in the Angels' 44-year history to strike out at least 100 batters in a season without starting a game. The others are Mark Clear (105), DeWayne Buice (109), Bryan Harvey (101) Scot Shields (109) and Francisco Rodríguez (123, 2004).

That year en route to winning the World Series he was 7 for 7 in save opportunities, tying John Wetteland for most saves in one postseason (since tied by Brad Lidge, Koji Uehara and Greg Holland; Robb Nen was also 7 for 7 but blew one on the 8th opportunity).

A four-time All-Star, Percival compiled a 29–38 record with a 2.99 ERA in 586.2 innings for the Angels. His 355 saves grant him inclusion in the 300 save club. However, his strikeouts per nine innings went down considerably after his years as an elite closer. In , his K/9 rate was 11.08. In 2002, 10.86. In , 8.76. And in 2004, it dropped all the way to 5.98. His fastball, once clocked consistently at 96 -100 MPH, was down to about 92 - 93 MPH in 2004, due to a degenerative hip condition that first appeared in 2003, which forced him to alter his pitching delivery.

Percival's contract with the Angels expired in 2004 and he became a free agent at the end of that season. Rather than bring Percival back, the Angels decided to turn to young phenom Francisco Rodríguez to close, motivated largely by Rodriguez's much lower price tag and concerns about Percival's age and health. The Angels offered to negotiate a reduced role (at a correspondingly reduced salary) for Percival to return as a setup man, but Percival decided to seek opportunities elsewhere that would allow him to remain a closer.

Later career and retirement
Percival signed with the Detroit Tigers as a free agent for the  season. However, after a mediocre start to his career at Comerica Park, during which he converted 8 saves from 11 opportunities and posted an ERA of 5.76, Percival suffered a serious injury to his right forearm in early July. The severity of the injury ended his season, as well put the rest of his career in doubt.

However, on his first outing he again suffered significant pain and left the team. After spending the entire 2006 season on the Tigers' disabled list and working for the team as an advance scout, Percival's contract with the Tigers expired at the end of the 2006 season.

Though he didn't pitch a game during the Tigers' run to the American League Championship, the team voted Percival a ring and a full playoff share. Appreciative of this gesture, he used the money to buy a suite at Comerica Park for his teammates' wives.

In November and December 2006, during his time off from baseball, Percival funded and himself built a new clubhouse at the Riverside Sports Complex, the home venue of his college baseball program, UC Riverside.

Comeback and second retirement

On January 19, the Los Angeles Angels of Anaheim hired Percival as a special assignment pitching instructor. However, believing his arm to have finally healed, he requested his release from his minor league coaching contract to pursue a comeback. Percival signed a contract with the St. Louis Cardinals and joined the big league team on June 26, 2007.  Percival was the fourth member of the 2002 championship Angels team to play for the 2007 Cardinals, joining David Eckstein, Scott Spiezio, and Adam Kennedy, as well as former Angels teammate Jim Edmonds.

Percival made his first appearance in the Majors since 2005 on June 29, 2007, against the Cincinnati Reds. He struck out the first batter he faced, David Ross, and was also credited with the win.

On November 29, 2007, he signed a two-year, $8 million contract with the Tampa Bay Rays. The contract contained up to $4 million in performance-based incentives.

On May 22, 2009, a day after allowing 2 runs in 1/3 of an inning against the Oakland Athletics, Percival was placed on Tampa Bay's disabled list, and has not pitched since. On August 11, 2009 he announced that he was likely to retire, and would cease his attempts at coming back from his current injury.

Coaching career
From 2010 to 2012, Percival was a volunteer pitching coach at Riverside Polytechnic High School. On September 24, 2012, Percival was hired as head varsity baseball coach at his alma mater,  Moreno Valley High School. On July 26, 2014, he was named head coach of the UC Riverside baseball team. On November 11, 2020, Percival resigned as head coach of the Highlanders, citing the desire to help his son through the professional ranks as his reason for resignation.

Head coaching record

Personal life
Percival's son, Cole, was drafted by the Arizona Diamondbacks in the 31st round of the 2017 MLB Draft.

Notes

External links

1969 births
Living people
American expatriate baseball players in Canada
American League All-Stars
Anaheim Angels players
Baseball coaches from California
Baseball players from Riverside, California
Boise Hawks players
California Angels players
Detroit Tigers players
High school baseball coaches in the United States
Lake Elsinore Storm players
Major League Baseball pitchers
Memphis Redbirds players
Midland Angels players
Palm Springs Angels players
People from Moreno Valley, California
Sportspeople from Riverside, California
St. Louis Cardinals players
Tampa Bay Rays players
UC Riverside Highlanders baseball coaches
UC Riverside Highlanders baseball players
Vancouver Canadians players